Kody Keplinger (born August 8, 1991, in Owensboro, Kentucky) is an American author of young adult and middle grade books. She is best known for her debut novel The DUFF, which she wrote when she was 17 years old. It was later turned into a movie of the same name.

In 2021, she wrote a graphic novel for DC antihero Poison Ivy.

Personal life
Keplinger was born with Leber Congenital Amaurosis and is legally blind.

Bibliography

Novels
 That's Not What Happened, 2020
 Run, 2016
 Lying Out Loud, 2015
 The Swift Boys & Me, 2014
 A Midsummer's Nightmare, 2012
 Shut Out, 2011
 The DUFF, 2010

Graphic novels
 Poison Ivy: Thorns, 2021 (illustrated by Sara Kipin)

References

External links
 Official website

Living people
Novelists from Kentucky
Ithaca College alumni
American women novelists
People from Owensboro, Kentucky
American LGBT novelists
1991 births
21st-century American women